Arnaud Clément and Michaël Llodra were the defending champions; however, they withdrew to due a left ankle injury for Clément.

Martin Damm and Pavel Vízner won in the final 7–6(7–0), 7–5, against Yves Allegro and Jeff Coetzee.

Seeds

Draw

Draw

External links
 Main Draw

Doubles